Translation initiation factor eIF-2B subunit gamma is a protein that in humans is encoded by the EIF2B3 gene.

References

Further reading